The 2009–10 season is Neftchi Baku's eighteenth Azerbaijan Premier League season. They started the season under the management of Boyukaga Aghayev before he left by mutual consent in mid September. Aghayev was replaced by Vagif Sadygov, who lasted 5 months before being sacked in mid February and replaced by Arif Asadov.

Squad

Transfers

Summer

In:

Out:

Winter

In:

Out:

Competitions

Azerbaijan Premier League

Results

League table

Azerbaijan Premier League Championship Group

Results

Table

Azerbaijan Cup

Squad statistics

Appearances and goals

|-
|colspan="14"|Players who appeared for Neftchi Baku that left during the season:

|}

Goal scorers

Disciplinary record

Player of the Month

References
Qarabağ have played their home games at the Tofiq Bahramov Stadium since 1993 due to the ongoing situation in Quzanlı.

External links 
 Neftchi Baku at Soccerway.com

Neftçi PFK seasons
Neftchi Baku